Otway L'Estage was an Australian rules footballer for  and . He was the son of John and Mary L'Estage who were Irish immigrants from Belfast.

References

Port Adelaide Football Club (SANFL) players
Port Adelaide Football Club players (all competitions)
1873 births
Australian rules footballers from South Australia
Norwood Football Club players
Australian people of Northern Ireland descent
1908 deaths